Burcu Çetinkaya (born March 19, 1981) is a Turkish rally driver and currently a television presenter.

She was educated in Robert College between 1992 and 1999. During this time, she played basketball. After two years spent at Babson College in Boston, USA, she returned to Turkey to continue her education in economics at the Koç University and graduated in 2005.

In 2003, she earned the gold medal in the parallel giant slalom and giant slalom events at the Turkish Women's Snowboard Championships.

Auto racing career
She debuted in auto racing with Hittite Rally in 2005. The same year, she won the Istanbul Ladies Rally Championship as a VW Polo Ladies Cup pilot. At 2006 Rally of Turkey she participated in her first World Rally Championship event.

She was the winner of the Castrol Fiesta Sporting Trophy in 2008.

In 2012, she became the runner-up in the Qatar National Rally Championship. In 2015, she married Fatih Mehmet Bucak. They have one son. They divorced in 2019.

See also
 List of female World Rally Championship drivers

References

External links
Burcu Çetinkaya at motorsporları.net
Profile at eWRC-results.com

1981 births
Sportspeople from Istanbul
Living people
Robert College alumni
Koç University alumni
World Rally Championship drivers
Turkish rally drivers
Turkish sportswomen
Female rally drivers
Turkish television presenters
Turkish women television presenters
Television people from Istanbul
Peugeot Sport drivers